Mitchell Burnside Clapp is an Australian-American aerospace engineer, former test pilot, and musician. He received Bachelor of Science degrees in Physics, Aeronautics and Astronautics, and Russian, as well as a Master of Science degree in Aeronautics and Astronautics, from the Massachusetts Institute of Technology.

Career
In the late 1980s and 1990s, Burnside Clapp attended the U.S. Air Force Test Pilot School and worked on the YA-7F and DC-X projects.

Together with Robert Zubrin and Chuck Lauer, Burnside Clapp founded Pioneer Rocketplane in 1996. He and Zubrin authored a piece in the MIT Technology Review of January/February 1998 calling for more air-launched rockets.

From 2011 to 2015, Burnside Clapp served as a program manager at DARPA.

Personal life
He is married to fellow filker TJ Burnside Clapp, formerly of the musical group Technical Difficulties. They have three children. He has won two Pegasus Awards for his music.

References

American aerospace engineers
Living people
MIT School of Engineering alumni
Filkers
Year of birth missing (living people)